The Statute Law Revision Act 1894 (57 & 58 Vict c 56) is an Act of the Parliament of the United Kingdom.

This Act was repealed for the United Kingdom by Group 1 of Part XVI of Schedule 1 to the Statute Law (Repeals) Act 1993.

The enactments which were repealed (whether for the whole or any part of the United Kingdom) by this Act were repealed so far as they extended to the Isle of Man on 25 July 1991.

This Act was retained for the Republic of Ireland by section 2(2)(a) of, and Part 4 of Schedule 1 to, the Statute Law Revision Act 2007.

Section 2 - Application of repealed enactments in local courts
The words "to the court of the county palatine of Lancaster or" in this section were repealed by section 56(4) of, and Part II of Schedule 11 to, the Courts Act 1971. This section was repealed by section 32(4) of, and Part V of Schedule 5 to, the Administration of Justice Act 1977.

Section 3 - Substituted repeals
This section provided that the Second Schedule to this Act was to be substituted for so much of the Statute Law Revision (No. 2) Act 1888 and of the Statute Law Revision Act 1892 as related to the Small Debt (Scotland) Act 1837 and to the 4 & 5 Vict c 10, and that the said Statute Law Revision Acts were to be read and construed accordingly.

This section was repealed by section 1 of, and the Schedule to, the Statute Law Revision Act 1908.

Schedules
Both Schedules were repealed by section 1 of, and the Schedule to, the Statute Law Revision Act 1908.

See also
Statute Law Revision Act

References
Halsbury's Statutes,
The Public General Acts passed in the fifty-seventh and fifty-eighth years of the reign of Her Majesty Queen Victoria. HMSO. London. 1894. Pages 183 to 244.

External links
List of amendments and repeals in the Republic of Ireland from the Irish Statute Book
  ["Note" and "Schedule" of the bill (unlike the schedule of the act as passed) gives commentary on each scheduled act, noting any earlier repeals and the reason for the new repeal]

United Kingdom Acts of Parliament 1894